Patrick Reiter (born 17 August 1972) is a retired  Austrian judoka. He competed at the 1996 Summer Olympics and the 2000 Summer Olympics.

Achievements

References

External links
 

1972 births
Living people
Austrian male judoka
Judoka at the 1996 Summer Olympics
Judoka at the 2000 Summer Olympics
Olympic judoka of Austria
20th-century Austrian people
21st-century Austrian people